Pakistan Today is a Pakistani English-language daily newspaper, published by Nawa Media Corporation from three Pakistani cities Lahore, Punjab; Karachi, Sindh; and Islamabad, Islamabad Capital Territory. The newspaper later launched a business magazine called Profit Magazine.

Operations
Headquartered in Lahore, the newspaper was founded by its editor and publisher, senior journalist Arif Nizami, in 2010. It is a part of Lahore-based Nawa Media Corporation, the media entity formed by him in 2008. Arif Nizami is the son of veteran Pakistani journalist Hameed Nizami (3 October 1915 – 22 February 1962) and had been associated with daily newspapers Nawa-i-Waqt and The Nation before this for many years.

Khabaristan Today 
Pakistan Today has a satirical column called Khabiristan Today. Since its material is often unfamiliar, its satire is sometimes lost on Western audiences. This was the case in 2014 when an article claiming the Pakistani Council of Islamic Ideology issued a proclamation stating all women are intrinsically weaker than men, was picked up by both internet and mainstream news sources.

Profit Magazine 
Profit Magazine began as a bi-weekly magazine. However, following a partnership with Wall Street Journal, the magazine was later made weekly with Farooq Tirmizi as editor. It is Pakistan's only weekly business and economic magazine. Following Farooq Tirmizi's resignation, Profit appointed Khurram Hussain as managing editor.

See also

 List of newspapers in Pakistan

References

External links
 Pakistan Today - Official website

2010 establishments in Pakistan
Culture in Lahore
Daily newspapers published in Pakistan
English-language newspapers published in Pakistan
Mass media in Lahore
Organisations based in Lahore
Publications established in 2010